Mining in Western Australia is administered in terms of the administrative divisions of the:-
 Gold or Mineral Field
 Goldfield District

There have also been various hierarchies of State Mining Engineer Inspectorate areas, as well as Mining Registrars Offices and areas.

List of fields
The following list is of the current Gold (G.F.) or Mineral (M.F.) Fields in the state
The prefix code number is that which is found on maps of the Mineral Fields of the state. Areas are in square kilometres and Gazetted dates are from a 1981 publication.
The three areas outside proclaimed Gold Fields are listed below the table: -

Mining districts outside proclaimed Gold fields in 1981 
 Eucla     124,500 km2  gazetted 6 October 1967 
 Nabberu   136,250 km2  gazetted 6 October 1967
 Warburton 260,483 km2  gazetted 6 October 1967 now number 69 above

See also
Eastern Goldfields
Ghost towns of the Goldfields of Western Australia
Goldfields–Esperance
Hints to Prospectors and Owners of Treatment Plants
Mining in Western Australia
Regions of Western Australia
State Batteries in Western Australia
Western Australia Atlas of mineral deposits and petroleum fields
Western Australian Goldfields

References

Further reading
 (1981) Mineral fields of the southwest : guide book / by S.A. Wilde, C.R.M. Butt, J.L. Baxter ; compiled by T.E. Johnston. [Australia] : Geological Society of Australia, 1981. Excursion guide ; A4 Geological Society of Australia, fifth Australian Geological Convention.
 (1936) Map of the Western Australian goldfields and mineral fields 1936 [cartographic material]/ Mines Department of Western Australia. Scale [ca.1:550 000]. [ca. 1" = 10 miles]. (E 112° -- E 123°/S 020° -- S 036°) Shows state batteries, telegraph lines and stock routes. Battye accession number 002306.

Western Australia-related lists
Western Australia
Economy of Australia-related lists